Vlastiboř may refer to places in the Czech Republic:

Vlastiboř (Jablonec nad Nisou District), a municipality and village in the Liberec Region
Vlastiboř (Tábor District), a municipality and village in the South Bohemian Region